Irimbranallur is a village in Thrissur district in the state of Kerala, India. There are about 784 houses in the village. 

Venkitangu is the gram panchayat of Irimbranallur village according to 2009 statistics.

References

Villages in Thrissur district